The Flint Enquirer is a small-circulation newspaper serving the African American community of Genesee County, Michigan.  It is distributed at local colleges and other locations.

Newspapers published in Michigan
Genesee County, Michigan